Bonnie Tiburzi (born August 31, 1948), is an American aviator. In 1973, at age 24, she became the first female pilot for American Airlines and the first female pilot for a major American commercial airline. At the same time she also became the first woman in the world to earn a Flight Engineer rating on a turbo-jet aircraft.

Early life
Bonnie Tiburzi Caputo was born Bonnie Linda Tiburzi. She was born August 31, 1948 in Connecticut. Her father was a pilot for Scandinavian Airlines SAS and later with Trans World Airlines TWA. After leaving the airline industry August Robert "Gus" Tiburzi owned and operated Tiburzi Airways – a flight school and charter company in Danbury, Connecticut.

Career
Tiburzi began her aviation career flying as a flight instructor and charter pilot. In 1973, at age 24, she became the first female pilot for American Airlines and the first female pilot for a major American commercial airline. She flew as a Captain on the Boeing 727, Boeing 757 and the Boeing 767. In 1986 Tiburzi wrote her autobiography, Takeoff: The Story of America's First Woman Pilot for a Major Airline. She retired from AAL in 1999 after 26 years.

Additional professional activities 
Trustee for the College of Aeronautics from 1990 - 2000.

Created and produced three "Women of Accomplishment" Award Luncheons for the Wings Club, Inc. in New York City from 1981 to 1983. These events honored women from various fields of endeavors - representing an array of important roles filled by women. Recipients included (among others) actress Polly Bergen, race car driver Janet Guthrie, TV anchorwoman Jane Pauley, feminist and author Betty Friedan, Rabbi Sally Priesand, actress and spokesperson Maureen O'Hara, Moya Lear of Lear Aircraft Company, Television Workshop's Faith Stewart-Gordon, opera singer Anna Moffo and Muriel Siebert, Superintendent of Banks, New York State.

Tiburzi received the "Chairman's Award for Outstanding Programming Service of the Year".

Created the "Information Bank" - a networking system for the International Society Of Women Airline Pilots to help further the career of future female pilots.

Guest speaker at many schools, colleges, and private clubs including the Federal Aviation Association, the Ninety Nines, the Smithsonian Air&Space Museum and the Wings Club.

Trustee and Tennis Chairperson for the Millbrook Golf and Tennis Club from 1999 - 2001.
Board Member of a New York Co-op Building in the 1990s

Publications 
1984 - Autobiography, "Takeoff" published by Crown Publishing Company
1984 - Researched and co-authored a magazine article with Dr. Jonathan Scher about pregnancy and flying published in Mothers Today Magazine.
Wrote the Pilot’s Guide to a Perfect Plane Ride for Woman's Day Magazine
Featured in Working Woman Magazine, Cosmopolitan, Harper's Bazaar, Glamour, Reader's Digest, Gold Coast Pictorial, Good Housekeeping,, Women's Wear Daily, Vogue, Woman's Day and the Smithsonian Air & Space Magazine.
Appeared in books by Henry Holden, Captain Robert Buck, John M. Capozzi, Lisa Yount and Carole S. Briggs - list incomplete.
American Way Magazine 2001 and 2015

Awards and recognition
1974 - Tiburzi received the Amita Award honoring Italian-American Women of Achievement. 
1979 - Recognized as a "Super Sister" and placed on Supersisters trading cards. These trading cards were distributed to school-age children nationwide.
1980 - Received the "Amelia Earhart Award" by the Northeast Chapter of Airport Managers
1982 - Featured in the Cutty Sark Salute to "Here's to Those Who Fly in the Face of Tradition" add campaign.
1984 - Recipient of the "Women of Accomplishment Award" by the Wings Club of New York City.
1985 - Recipient of the Zonta Club of New York's "Non-Stop Achievement Award". 
1987 - Selected by Woman's Day Magazine as one of "50 Women Wo Have Changed Our Lives". 
1988 - Featured in Family Circle Magazine's "Women Who Make a Difference". 
1998 - Recipient of the "Women Making History Award" from the National Women's History Museum in Washington, D.C.
2014 - Bonnie Tiburzi Caputo Day In the Town of Brookhaven, New York on April 2, 2014
2017 - Tiburzi was the Key Note Speaker at the New York Bar Associations Aviation Division in New York City.
2017 - Recipient of the "Women That Soar Award" in Dallas, Texas. 
2018 - Inducted into the "Women in Aviation International Hall of Fame" in Reno, Nevada. 
2018 - Appeared in American Airlines’ Celebrated Living Magazine.  
2018 - Appeared in American Way magazine with Film Independence Bonnie Award winner Chloe Zhao
2019 - Tiburzi led a panel discussion at "The Wing" in New York City with film directors Debra Granik and Marielle Heller.
2020 - Appeared in American Way magazine with Film Independent Bonnie Award winner Kelly Reichardt

In 2018, the Independent Spirit Awards inaugurated the Bonnie Award, named after Tiburzi. Chloé Zhao was the first to receive this award.

Tiburzi's American Airlines pilot uniform is on display at the Smithsonian's National Air and Space Museum in Washington, D.C.

See also
 Emily Howell, Frontier Airlines pilot
 Turi Widerøe, SAS pilot
 Yvonne Sintes, UK pilot

References

Further reading
 
 
  (5 pages) Online excerpt.

External links
 Bonnie Tiburzi Caputo's Buzz – Personal blog.

1948 births
Living people
American autobiographers
Aviators from Connecticut
Women autobiographers
Commercial aviators
American women commercial aviators
American women non-fiction writers
American aviation writers
American Airlines people
20th-century American non-fiction writers
20th-century American women writers
Writers from Connecticut
21st-century American women